The Cinturó de l'Empordà was a road bicycle race held annually in Spain. It was organized as a 2.2 event on the UCI Europe Tour.

Winners

References

UCI Europe Tour races
2000 establishments in Spain
2011 disestablishments in Spain
Recurring sporting events established in 2000
Recurring sporting events disestablished in 2011
Cycle races in Spain
Defunct cycling races in Spain